Eugène Rubens-Alcais (7 May 1884 – 8 March 1963) was a French deaf activist in the field of sports. He is known for introducing the Deaflympics in 1924 for deaf sportspeople. He was determined to establish international competitions for the deaf, as they were considered as intellectually disabled people during his lifetime. Alcais believed that deaf athletes should have their own independent international competitions and promoted the idea in his own deaf sports magazine called The Silent Sportsman. In 1924, he was instrumental in hosting the inaugural Summer Deaflympics in his home country, France. Alcais is also the founder of Comité International des Sports des Sourds (now called the International Committee of Sports for the Deaf), the world governing body of deaf sports. He is often called the "father of Deaflympics" or "father of Olympics for the deaf".

Biography 
Alcais was born on 7 May, 1884 to a poor family in Saint-Jean-du-Gard, France. He was an auto mechanic by profession and a competitive cyclist.

Contributions to promote deaf sports 
Eugène Rubens-Alcais is considered a pioneer of the deaf sports movement along with Antoine Dresse of Belgium. He was successful in hosting a multi-sport event for people who have hearing problems, known as the International Games for the Deaf or International Silent Games (now renamed the Deaflympics) in 1924. He himself as a deaf person realised that deaf people were discriminated against and were not allowed to compete in the Olympics, so he wanted to introduce a similar multi-sporting event. He was popular among the deaf community because of his initiatives to conduct competitions like Deaflympics for the goodwill of deaf participants.

Alcais founded the Comité International des Sports des Sourds (CISS)  jointly with Antoine in 1918 and served as its first President from 1924 to 1953. He also founded the Paris Sports Club for Deaf Mutes, which is now referred to as the Comité de Coordination des Sportifs Sourds de France (French Deaf Sports Federation), to improve the level of deaf sport in France. It is also the national governing body of France for deaf sports and to send deaf competitors to represent France at the Deaflympics.

Due to his immense services to deaf society, he is often recognized as the deaf version of Baron de Coubertin, the father of the modern Olympics.

In order to respect him, the ICSD introduced Rubens-Alcais award which has been awarded for the development and improvement of deaf sports in various countries.

Awards 
 Gold medal of honour of Deaflympics (1949)
 Honorary Life Member of ICDS since 1953

References 

1884 births
1963 deaths
French sports executives and administrators
Deaf activists
French deaf people

Burials at Ivry Cemetery